KPWD may refer to:

 Karnataka Public Works Department
 Kerala Public Works Department
 KPWD (FM), a radio station (91.7 FM) licensed to serve Lefors, Texas, United States